Càrn Mòr is a mountain on the edge of the Rough Bounds of Knoydart in the Northwest Highlands of Scotland. At a height of  it is classified as a Corbett whilst its prominence of  means it is also classified as a Marilyn.

Geography 

Càrn Mòr has moderate slopes on its eastern to southeastern side which become steep in a few places but are generally crag free. On the west to northwestern side however the hill is steep and craggy and therefore more characteristic of its neighbours in the Rough Bounds of Knoydart.

Ascents 

Càrn Mòr can be climbed from Strathan in the east via its east ridge, an approach which avoids the most difficult terrain found on the western side.

References and Footnotes 

Mountains and hills of the Northwest Highlands
Marilyns of Scotland
Corbetts